Sampietrini (also sanpietrini) is the typical kind of pavement found in the historic district of Rome and in St. Peter's Square, Vatican City. The earliest examples were made by trimming large blocks that had been used in ancient Roman roads, recently discovered in fifteenth- and sixteenth-century archaeological excavations. The first documented use in Rome of "sampietrini" stones was during the reign of Pope Pius V (1566–72). Over the next two centuries the stones were used to pave all the main streets of Rome, because this mode was superior to brick, for example by providing a smoother and stronger surface for carriages, among other reasons.

Positive aspects of sampietre include:
 it leaves small channels in between the individual bricks for water to pass through
 it easily adapts to the irregularities of the ground
 it is a strong material
 after it has been laid down, it remains firm for a long time

Negatives include:
 the ground becomes irregular over time
 if wet, it can become very slippery

Because of its peculiarities, the sampietrini are not suitable for streets where traffic travels at high speed. Nowadays its use is largely confined to historical or very narrow streets in the centre of Rome (in Trastevere for example), where the traffic is light and slow.

The widespread availability of sampietrini have also made it a weapon of choice in Italian riots since the 1960s.

In July 2005 the mayor of Rome Walter Veltroni declared that the Sampietrini pavement was causing several problems: its irregularity could be dangerous for people riding mopeds or any two-wheeled vehicles; moreover big vehicles passing on it are very noisy and cause wide vibrations that can damage the surrounding buildings. Even though it was argued that these problems are caused by inadequate maintenance, Veltroni said that, from now on, the Sampietrini will be removed wherever possible, keeping them only in pedestrianised areas and characteristic streets.

Notes

Sources 
Cibin, Ludovica, "Selciato Romano; il sampietrino" (Rome: Gangemi) 2005.
  Sampietrini: una grana per Veltroni, il Giornale 
 Roma dice addio ai sampietrini asfalto anche nelle vie del centro, la Repubblica 
Rinne, Katherine, "The Waters of Rome: Aqueducts, Fountains, and the Birth of the Baroque City," chapter 9 (New Haven: Yale) 2010.

Pavements
History of Rome
 Sampietrini